The UTD/Synergy Park station is a future train station along the Dallas Area Rapid Transit Silver Line. The station will be located near Rutford Avenue at the north end of the University of Texas at Dallas campus in Richardson, Texas. 

The station will serve the University of Texas at Dallas campus and Synergy Park.

References

Dallas Area Rapid Transit commuter rail stations
Richardson, Texas
Proposed public transportation in Texas
Proposed railway stations in the United States
Railway stations in Texas at university and college campuses
Railway stations scheduled to open in 2024